Lakeshore is an unincorporated community and census-designated place in Ouachita Parish, Louisiana, United States. Its population was 1,930 as of the 2010 census. The community is located on the south bank of Bayou Desiard, east of Monroe.

Geography

Demographics

2020 census

As of the 2020 United States census, there were 1,988 people, 842 households, and 480 families residing in the CDP.

References

Unincorporated communities in Ouachita Parish, Louisiana
Unincorporated communities in Louisiana
Census-designated places in Ouachita Parish, Louisiana
Census-designated places in Louisiana